Samsung SDI Co., Ltd. is a battery and electronic materials manufacturer headquartered in Yongin, Gyeonggi-do, South Korea. Samsung SDI operates its business with Energy Solutions and Electronic Materials segment. The Energy Solution segment manufactures rechargeable batteries used for IT device, automotive, and Energy Storage System (ESS) applications, and the Electronic Materials segment produces materials for semiconductors and displays.
In the first half of 2022, Samsung SDI is ranked sixth in the world with a market share of 5 per cent according to SNE research. In 2022, Samsung SDI starts to build pilot line for solid-state batteries in the South Korean city of Suwon.

In 2012, Samsung SDI and several other major companies were fined by the European Commission for price fixing of TV cathode-ray tubes.

See also
SB LiMotive
List of electric-vehicle-battery manufacturers
Samsung
Samsung Electronics

References

External links
 

1970 establishments in South Korea
Companies listed on the Korea Exchange
South Korean brands
Samsung subsidiaries
Battery manufacturers
Electric vehicle battery manufacturers